He Hongjun (born August 1961) is a lieutenant general in the People's Liberation Army of China.

He is a delegate to the 13th National People's Congress. He is a member of the 20th Central Committee of the Chinese Communist Party.

Biography
He was born in Yang County, Shaanxi, in August 1961. He was deputy head of the Cadre Bureau of the People's Liberation Army General Political Department in 2014, in addition to serving as director of the Bureau of Veteran Cadres. He rose to become deputy head of the Political Work Department of the Central Military Commission in April 2019.

He was promoted to the rank of major general (shaojiang) in July 2013 and lieutenant general (zhongjiang) in December 2019.

References

1961 births
Living people
People from Yang County
People's Liberation Army generals from Shaanxi
People's Republic of China politicians from Shaanxi
Chinese Communist Party politicians from Shaanxi
Members of the 20th Central Committee of the Chinese Communist Party
Delegates to the 13th National People's Congress